The 2019 Croatian Cup Final between Dinamo Zagreb and Rijeka was played on 22 May 2019 in Pula.

Road to the final

Match details

External links 
Official website 

2019 Final
GNK Dinamo Zagreb matches
HNK Rijeka matches
Cup Final
Croatian Football Cup Final